Senator Echols may refer to:

Edward Echols (1849–1914), Virginia State Senate
M. Patton Echols (1925–2012), Virginia State Senate
Odis Echols (1930–2013), New Mexico State Senate
Robert Milner Echols (1798–1847), Georgia State Senate